Ian Rupert Emerson Gray (born 16 December 1963) is a Belizean middle-distance runner. He competed in the men's 1500 metres at the 1992 Summer Olympics.

References

External links
 

1963 births
Living people
Athletes (track and field) at the 1988 Summer Olympics
Athletes (track and field) at the 1992 Summer Olympics
Belizean male middle-distance runners
Belizean male long-distance runners
Olympic athletes of Belize
Place of birth missing (living people)